is a train station in Ōta, Tokyo, Japan, operated by the private railway operator Tokyu Corporation.

Lines
Tamagawa Station is served by the following three lines.
Tokyu Toyoko Line (TY09)
Tokyu Meguro Line (MG09)
Tokyu Tamagawa Line (TM01)

Station layout

There are two levels. The high level station serves the Toyoko and Meguro lines, while the underground station is the terminus of the Tokyu Tamagawa Line. The upper level is an elevated station with two island platforms serving four tracks. The lower level has one island platform serving two tracks.

Platforms

History
The station opened on 11 March 1923.

Nearby landmarks
 Tamagawadai Park
 Denenchofu Catholic Church
 Nishimoriinari shrine
 Former Tama playing ground of the Yomiuri Giants baseball team
 Maruko bridge

References

External links

 Tokyu station information 

Railway stations in Japan opened in 1923
Tokyu Toyoko Line
Tokyu Meguro Line
Tokyu Tamagawa Line
Railway stations in Tokyo
Ōta, Tokyo